The 2015 Oceania Sevens Championship was the eighth Oceania Sevens. It was held in West Auckland, New Zealand on 14–15 November 2015. As well as determining the regional championship, the tournament was also a qualifying event for the 2016 Olympics sevens, with the highest-placed eligible team gaining a direct berth to Rio de Janeiro.

Australia won the tournament, defeating Tonga 50–0 in the final. The second and third place getters Tonga and Samoa received invitations to the final qualification tournament. Fiji and New Zealand did not participate in the 2015 Oceania Sevens as they had already qualified for the 2016 Olympics.

Teams
Participating nations for the 2015 tournament are:

Pool stage

All times are New Zealand Daylight Time, i.e. UTC+13.

Pool A

Pool B

Knockout stage

Plate

Cup

Final standings

Tonga and Papua New Guinea also qualified to the 2016 Hong Kong Sevens World Series qualifier.

See also
 2015 Oceania Women's Sevens Championship

References

2015
2015 in New Zealand rugby union
2015 rugby sevens competitions
2015 in Oceanian rugby union
International rugby union competitions hosted by New Zealand
Rugby sevens competitions in New Zealand